Hillar Mets (born 15 August 1954) is an Estonian cartoonist, illustrator and animator.

Career
 Film studio Tallinnfilm (1975–1976)
 Theatre Vanemuine, artist (1976–1979)
 Animated film studio Joonisfilm, animator (1979–1985)
 Journal Pikker, AD (1985–1990)
 Freelanze illustrator (1990–1998)
 Since 1998 works in the Estonian daily Eesti Päevaleht as an illustrator and editorial cartoonist
 Member of the Estonian Artists' Association

His illustrations have been published in publications Eesti Päevaleht, Noorus, Täheke, Põhjanael, Pikker, City Paper, Eesti Naine and Toiduproff.

His illustrations have been published by numerous publishing houses: Valgus, Perioodika, Avita, Koolibri, Egmont, Pegasus, Varrak, Tänapäev, Draakon ja Kuu, Tammerraamat and Campus-Verlag.
Among these works are more than 30 jacket illustrations for Estonian versions of
Discworld series by Terry Pratchett, published by Varrak. Also he has created illustrations and covers for Estonian versions of Sideways Stories From Wayside School series by Louis Sachar, published by Draakon ja Kuu.

Among his clients are: The Permanent Representation of Estonia to the EU, The Estonian Institute, The State Chancellery of the Republic of Estonia, University of Tartu, The Ministry of Social Affairs, The Institute of Health Development, The Estonian Information Bureau of European Parliament, The Embassy of Finland in Tallinn etc.

Hillar Mets' works have been exhibited in many invited cartoon exhibitions in Finland, Norway, Belgium, the Netherlands, Italy, Hungary, Lithuania, Greece, Sweden, Germany, Japan etc.

Prizes
 VIII Mostra Internazionale del Disegno Ancona (Italy) silver medal 1985
 Witty World cartoon contest Budapest II place 1990
 Knokke Heist (Belgium) Bronzen Hoed 1992
 SKOP-bank of Finland, first prize at a cartoon contest 1992
 Knokke Heist (Belgium) Bronzen Hoed 1993
 XII Mostra Internazionale del Disegno Ancona (Italy) silver medal 1993
 Yomiuri International Cartoon Contest (Tokyo) medal 1995

References
 Hilarious Estonia 
 Cartoon exhibition in Darmstadt, Embassy of Estonia in Berlin 
 Estonian versions of Discworld series by Terry Pratchett, publishing house Varrak 
 Estonian versions of Sideways Stories From Wayside School series by Louis Sachar, publishing house Draakon ja Kuu 
 Exhibition Estonia 5 years in European Union – EU in cartoons in Tallinn 
 The exhibition “University Laughs” is dedicated to the 90th anniversary of the University of Tartu
 Cartoon exhibition “101 Estonian cartoons” 
 Winner of the Budapest International Cartoon Festival 
 Cartoon exhibition “Cartoon in Europe of 27” 
 Liis Auväärt "Argitsirkuse sõbralik kloun" , Eesti Naine, 5. oktoober 2009
 Ilona Martson :et:Ilona Martson "Viis aastat Tähekese jutumulle" Täheke, 20. jaanuar 2009
 Tanel Veenre :et:Tanel Veenre "Pliiats, mis räägib anekdoote"  Eesti Päevaleht, 3. veebruar 2010
 Exhibition in Estonian Children Literature Centre 2010 
 Exhibition in Estonian Children Literature Centre 2011

External links
 homepage
 Blogspot

1954 births
Estonian cartoonists
Estonian caricaturists
Estonian illustrators
Living people
Recipients of the Order of the White Star, 5th Class